Ringerike Grand Prix is a road bicycle race held annually near Hønefoss, in the region of Ringerike, Norway. The race was created in 1975 as the Fossen Grand Prix, and was ranked 2.2 on the UCI Europe Tour between 2005 and 2010. In 2011 it turned into a one-day race (not UCI race) while Tour of Norway, held in the whole eastern Norway, replaced it on the calendar. In 2013 the race came back on the UCI Europe Tour as a race ranked 1.2.

Winners

References

External links

UCI Europe Tour races
Cycle races in Norway
Recurring sporting events established in 1975
1975 establishments in Norway
Summer events in Norway